Tamelerdeamani is believed to have been a King of Kush from the 3rd century AD. He was preceded by Teqorideamani and followed by Adeqetali.

His name appears on a copper medallion and a fragment of masonry. Both engravings were found at Meroe which were written in the Meroitic script.

Tamelerdeamani was buried at Meroe, at either Beg. N 27  or Beg. N 34.

References

3rd-century monarchs of Kush
3rd-century monarchs in Africa